Boneh-ye Kazem Jamal (also Romanized as Boneh-ye Kāz̧em Jamāl; also known as Boneh-ye Kāz̧em) is a village in Aghili-ye Jonubi Rural District, Aghili District, Gotvand County, Khuzestan Province, Iran. At the 2006 census, its population was 780, in 146 families.

References 

Populated places in Gotvand County